No Zin-soo (born March 9, 1970) is a South Korean film director and screenwriter.

Career 
Born in Daegu in 1970, No Zin-soo majored in Korean Language and Literature at the Yeungnam University. He was involved in commercial film productions before he made his first feature-length debut with Da Capo (2007) and was invited to the 8th Jeonju International Film Festival. His second feature Norwegian Woods (2010) was invited to the Bucheon International Fantastic Film Festival 2009 and the Yubari International Fantastic Film Festival in 2010.

No is noted for his unique directing style with films of different genre types.

Filmography 
Love Wind Love Song (1999) - art director
Tell Me Something (1999) - production department
Bloody Beach (2000) - screenwriter
Asako in Ruby Shoes (2000) - 2nd assistant director
Bet on My Disco (2002) - script editor
Da Capo (2007) - director, editor, script editor, actor
Norwegian Woods (2010) - director, screenwriter
Total Messed Family (2014) - director, screenwriter
The Suffered (2014) - director, screenwriter, actor
The Maidroid (2015) - director, executive producer, script editor
Nineteen: Shh! No Imagining! (2015) - director
Death in Desert (2015) - director, screenwriter, actor
Summer of Director Oh (2016) - director, producer, screenwriter
Female War: A Nasty Deal (2016) - director,
Manner Teacher (2016) - director, script editor

References

External links 
 
 
 

1970 births
Living people
People from Daegu
South Korean film directors
South Korean screenwriters
Yeungnam University alumni